The Cabrillo Handicap was an American Thoroughbred horse race run annually at Del Mar Racetrack in Del Mar, California from 1966 through 1990. Open to horses age three and older, the Grade 3 event was raced on dirt. Contested at various distances, in its final years it was set at a mile and one-eighth (nine furlongs)

The race was won by such top horses as Cougar II, Kennedy Road, Proud Birdie, Gato Del Sol, Ferdinand, and Precisionist.

The Cabrillo Handicap was run in two divisions in 1966.

Winners

1990 - Miserden
1989 - Lively One
1988 - Precisionist
1987 - Ferdinand
1986 - Hopeful Word
1985 - Last Command
1984 - Video Kid
1983 - Gato Del Sol
1982 - Caterman
1981 - Tahitian King
1980 - Teddy Doon
1979 - Quick Turnover
1978 - Vic's Magic

1977 - Proud Birdie
1976 - Branford Court
1975 - Against The Snow
1974 - War Heim
1973 - Kennedy Road
1972 - Imaginative
1971 - Kobuk King
1970 - Cougar II
1969 - Balsamo
1968 - Pinjara
1967 - Bern Book
1966 - Adopted
1966 - Old Mose

References

Del Mar Racetrack
Horse races in California
Discontinued horse races
Grade 3 stakes races in the United States
Recurring sporting events established in 1966
Recurring sporting events disestablished in 1990
1966 establishments in California
1990 disestablishments in California